Rocky Branch is a  long 1st order tributary to Reedy Fork in Guilford County, North Carolina.

Course
Rocky Branch rises on the Candy Creek divide about 1 mile southeast of Monticello, North Carolina in Guilford County.  Rocky Branch then flows south to meet Reedy Fork about 4 miles southeast of Monticello.

Watershed
Rocky Branch drains  of area, receives about 46.0 in/year of precipitation, has a topographic wetness index of 404.65 and is about 51% forested.

References

Rivers of North Carolina
Rivers of Guilford County, North Carolina